Amarpal Sharma is an Indian politician and a member of the 16th Legislative Assembly of Uttar Pradesh of India. He represents the Sahibabad constituency of Uttar Pradesh and was a member of the Bahujan Samaj Party political party. He is now a member of samajwadi party.

Early life and education
Amarpal Sharma was born in Ghaziabad. He attended the Inter Mediat Rajkiya Vihayalya and was educated to the Twelfth grade.

Political career
Amarpal Sharma has been a MLA for one term. He represented the Sahibabad constituency and was a member of the Bahujan Samaj Party political party until 16 January 2017, when he was expelled for anti-party activities by allegedly attempting to cooperate with the rival Bharatiya Janata Party. He has since joined the Indian National Congress.

Posts held

See also
Sahibabad
Sixteenth Legislative Assembly of Uttar Pradesh
Uttar Pradesh Legislative Assembly

References 

Bahujan Samaj Party politicians from Uttar Pradesh
Indian National Congress politicians
Uttar Pradesh MLAs 2012–2017
People from Ghaziabad district, India
1968 births
Living people
Samajwadi Party politicians from Uttar Pradesh